The fourth election to South Glamorgan County Council was held in May 1985. It was preceded by the 1981 election and followed by the 1989 election.

Boundary changes
There were wholesale boundary changes at this election. The previous multi-member wards were abolished and replaced with 62 new single-member wards. A small number of the wards remained unchanged.

Candidates
Conservative and Labour candidates contested all seats, as did the Liberal candidates, now in the Alliance with the SDP. There were a smaller number of Plaid Cymru and Green Party candidates and a few Independents.

Following boundary changes, two sitting members opposed each other in the Cornerswell, Landsdowne and Llandaff North wards.

Outcome
Having regained control of the authority in 1981, Labour retained control by a comfortable majority. The Liberals and SDP also made some advances in Cardiff.
This table summarises the result of the elections in all wards. 62 councillors were elected.

Some of the seats where Alliance candidates were successful had the highest turnouts in the county. Among other seats, one of the highest turnouts (59.6%) was in the Rhoose with Llancarfan ward where the sitting councillor, elected as a Conservative in 1981, stood as an Independent but finished bottom of the poll.

|}

Ward Results

Adamsdown

Baruc

Butetown

Buttrills

Cadoc

Canton

Castleland

Central

Cornerswell

Court

Cowbridge

Cyncoed Village

Cyntwell

Deri

Dinas Powys North

Dinas Powys South

Dyfan

Eglwys Wen

Fairwater

Gabalfa

Gibbonsdown

Glan Ely

Heath Park

Highmead

Illtyd

Lakeside

Landsdowne

Lisvane with St Mellons

Llandaff

Llandaff North

Llanedeyrn

Llanrumney North

Llanrumney South

Mackintosh

Maindy

North Whitchurch with Tongwynlais

Pantllacca

Pantmawr

Park

Pentre Bane

Penylan

Plymouth

Pontcanna

Radyr with St Fagans

Rhoose with Llancarfan

Riverside South

Rumney

Saltmead

Splott

St Athan with Boverton

St Augustines

Stanwell

The Marl

Thornhill

Ton-yr-Ywen

Trelai

Tremorfa

Trowbridge

Ty Glas

Vale of Glamorgan North East

Vale of Glamorgan South West

Waterloo

KEY

* existing councillor, for the same ward
o existing councillor, though because of boundary changes not for the same ward

References

1985 Welsh local elections
South Glamorgan County Council elections